Manuel Dominguez "Ralph" Onis (October 24, 1908 in Tampa, Florida – January 4, 1995), nicknamed "Curly", was a professional baseball player who played catcher in one game for the Brooklyn Dodgers on April 27, 1935. Onis singled in his only at-bat for a rare career batting average of 1.000.

His parents were born in Asturias, Spain, and he is buried in the Centro Asturiano de Tampa.

Onis managed in the Florida State League in 1939 and 1940.

Further reading

External links

1908 births
1995 deaths
Major League Baseball catchers
Baseball players from Florida
Brooklyn Dodgers players
American people of Spanish descent
Minor league baseball managers
Johnstown Johnnies players
Hartford Senators players
Dayton Ducks players
Reading Brooks players
Allentown Brooks players
Toledo Mud Hens players
Fort Worth Cats players
Sioux City Cowboys players
Leesburg Anglers players
Hartford Bees players
Orlando Senators players